Michaël Llodra and Fabrice Santoro were the defending champions, but Llodra did not compete this year. Santoro teamed up with Richard Gasquet and successfully defended his title, by defeating Julian Knowle and Jürgen Melzer 3–6, 6–1, [11–9] in the final.

Seeds

Draw

Draw

References

External links
 Main draw (ATP)
 ITF tournament profile

Open de Moselle - Doubles
2006 Open de Moselle